Lasalimu is an Austronesian language spoken on Buton Island off the southeast coast of Sulawesi in Indonesia. It belongs to the Muna–Buton branch of the Celebic subgroup.

References 

Muna–Buton languages
Languages of Sulawesi